Tikamgarh railway station is located in Tikamgarh district of Madhya Pradesh and serves Tikamgarh town. Its code is "TKMG". Passenger, Express and Superfast trains halt here.

Major trains

Following trains halt at Tikamgarh railway station in both directions:

 Bhopal–Khajuraho Mahamana Superfast Express
 Khajuraho–Tikamgarh Passenger
 Khajuraho–Kurukshetra Express
 Prayagraj–Dr.Ambedkarnagar Express

References

Railway stations in Tikamgarh district
Jhansi railway division